UCSC may refer to:

University of California, Santa Cruz, a public, collegiate research university and one of 10 campuses in the University of California system
Università Cattolica del Sacro Cuore, an Italian private research university founded in 1921
University of Colombo School of Computing, a higher educational institute affiliated to the University of Colombo in Sri Lanka
 University City Science Center
Catholic University of the Holy Conception (Universidad Católica de la Santísima Concepción), a university in Chile and part of the Chilean Traditional Universities